Alexander George "Killer" Kaleta (November 29, 1919 – July 9, 1987) was a Canadian professional ice hockey player. He played in the National Hockey League (NHL) for the Chicago Black Hawks and New York Rangers and is best known for his part in originating hockey's hat trick tradition.

Playing career
After playing in the Alberta Senior Hockey League (ASHL), Kaleta joined the NHL with the Chicago Black Hawks in 1941–42.  He recorded 28 points in 47 games as a rookie that season.  During his tenure with the Black Hawks, he is credited with having begun the tradition of the hat trick during the 1945–46 season, when he entered a shop in Toronto looking for a new hat.  Without enough money to buy one, he reached an agreement with shop owner Sammy Taft that if he scored three goals that night in a game against the Toronto Maple Leafs, he would earn a free hat.  In fact, that night, on January 26, 1946, he scored four goals against the Leafs.  While there are other accounts of the hat trick's origin in hockey, Kaleta's story is the one recognized by the Hockey Hall of Fame.  Kaleta went on to complete the season that year with an NHL career-high 46 points.

After four seasons with the Black Hawks, Kaleta joined the New York Rangers in 1948–49.  He recorded consecutive 31-point seasons in two seasons with the Rangers before ending his NHL career by joining the Saskatoon Quakers of the minor pro Pacific Coast Hockey League (PCHL) in 1951–52.  The next season, the PCHL was absorbed by the Western Hockey League (1952–1974)Western Hockey League (WHL), where Kaleta played with the Quakers for three more seasons before retiring in 1954–55.

References

External links

1919 births
1987 deaths
Canadian ice hockey left wingers
Chicago Blackhawks players
Ice hockey people from Alberta
New York Rangers players
People from Canmore, Alberta
Canadian expatriates in the United States